This is a List of facilities of the British Commonwealth Air Training Plan in Australia (BCATP), a major program for training Royal Australian Air Force (RAAF) air crews during World War II for service with the Royal Air Force. Agreed in December 1939, the program was known in Australia as the Empire Air Training Scheme (EATS). The first Australian training schools were established the following year. Course duration and content evolved over time but the basic structure of the scheme remained the same for the duration of the war. Over 52,000 personnel enlisted in the RAAF as aircrew and some 37,000 graduated from EATS schools.

Facilities

Central Flying School
Formed in 1940, Central Flying School was responsible for training flying instructors and was located initially at Point Cook, Victoria. It soon relocated to Camden, New South Wales, then to Tamworth, New South Wales, in 1942 and Parkes, New South Wales, in 1944.

Initial Training Schools
Recruits started their training at an Initial Training School (ITS) to learn the basics of Air Force life. The course ran 14 weeks for prospective pilots, 12 weeks for air observers, and 8 weeks for air gunners.
 No. 1 Initial Training School, Somers, Victoria
 No. 2 Initial Training School, Bradfield Park, New South Wales
 No. 3 Initial Training School, Sandgate, Queensland.
 No. 4 Initial Training School, Victor Harbor, South Australia.
 No. 5 Initial Training School, Pearce, Western Australia
 No. 6 Initial Training School, Bradfield Park, New South Wales

Elementary Flying Training Schools
The Elementary Flying Training School (EFTS) course lasted 12 weeks and gave recruits up to 75 hours of basic aviation instruction on a simple trainer like the Tiger Moth.  Pilots who showed promise went on to advanced training at a Service Flying Training School.  Others went on to different specialty schools, such as Wireless Schools, Air Observer Schools or Bombing and Gunnery Schools.
 No. 1 Elementary Flying Training School, initially No. 2 Flying Training School, Parafield, South Australia, renamed No. 1 EFTS, relocated to Tamworth, New South Wales
 No. 2 Elementary Flying Training School, initially No. 3 Flying Training School, Archerfield, Queensland, renamed No. 2 EFTS
 No. 3 Elementary Flying Training School, Essendon, Victoria
 No. 4 Elementary Flying Training School, Mascot, New South Wales
 No. 5 Elementary Flying Training School, Narromine, New South Wales
 No. 6 Elementary Flying Training School, Tamworth, New South Wales.
 No. 7 Elementary Flying Training School, Western Junction, Tasmania
 No. 8 Elementary Flying Training School, Narrandera, New South Wales
 No. 9 Elementary Flying Training School, Cunderdin, Western Australia
 No. 10 Elementary Flying Training School, Temora, New South Wales
 No. 11 Elementary Flying Training School, Benalla, Victoria
 No. 12 Elementary Flying Training School, Bundaberg, Queensland, relocated to Lowood, Queensland

Service Flying Training Schools
The Service Flying Training School (SFTS) course ran for 24 weeks and provided advanced training for pilots on single- and multi-engined aircraft, closer in performance to the types they would eventually fly as operational or "service" pilots. Prospective fighter pilots underwent air gunnery instruction at the SFTS, while bomber pilots undertook two weeks instruction at a Bombing and Gunnery School.
 No. 1 Service Flying Training School, formed from No. 1 Flying Training School, Point Cook, Victoria
 No. 2 Service Flying Training School, Forest Hill, New South Wales
 No. 3 Service Flying Training School, Amberley, Queensland
 No. 4 Service Flying Training School, Geraldton, Western Australia
 No. 5 Service Flying Training School, Uranquinty, New South Wales
 No. 6 Service Flying Training School, Mallala, South Australia
 No. 7 Service Flying Training School, Deniliquin, New South Wales
 No. 8 Service Flying Training School, Bundaberg, Queensland

Air Observer Schools
 No. 1 Air Observers School, Cootamundra, New South Wales, relocated to Evans Head, New South Wales
 No. 2 Air Observers School, Mount Gambier, South Australia
 No. 3 Air Observers School, Port Pirie, South Australia

Bombing and Gunnery Schools
 No. 1 Bombing and Gunnery School, Evans Head, New South Wales
 No. 2 Bombing and Gunnery School, Port Pirie, South Australia
 No. 3 Bombing and Gunnery School, West Sale, renamed Air Gunnery School
 Central Gunnery School, Sale, Victoria, relocated to Mildura, Victoria and later Cressy, Victoria.

Air Navigation Schools
 No. 1 Air Navigation School, Parkes, New South Wales
 No. 2 Air Navigation School, Mount Gambier, South Australia, relocated to Nhill, Victoria.

Wireless Air Gunners Schools
 No. 1 Wireless Air Gunners School, Ballarat, Victoria
 No. 2 Wireless Air Gunners School, Parkes, New South Wales
 No. 3 Wireless Air Gunners School, Maryborough, Queensland

General Reconnaissance School
The General Reconnaissance School was formed at Point Cook, Victoria, in 1940 It subsequently relocated to Laverton, Victoria, then Cressy, Victoria, and finally Bairnsdale, Victoria

See also
 List of British Commonwealth Air Training Plan facilities in Canada
 List of British Commonwealth Air Training Plan facilities in South Africa

Notes

References

RAAF training units
 
 
 BCATP
 BCATP